John D. Freeman (1817January 17, 1886) was a U.S. Representative from Mississippi.

Born in 1817 in Cooperstown, New York, Freeman attended the common schools. He moved to Mississippi and located in Grand Gulf. He studied law. He was admitted to the bar and practiced.
He served as district attorney. He moved to Natchez, Mississippi.
Attorney general of Mississippi from 1841 to 1851.
He was author of the first volume of reports of decisions of the Chancery Court of Mississippi published in 1844.

Freeman was elected as a Unionist to the Thirty-second Congress (March 4, 1851 - March 3, 1853). He served as attorney general. He argued Mitchell v. Wells, a case questioning whether a man could leave property to his daughter, who had been born one of his slaves. The father freed his daughter, Nancy Wells, and then tried to leave property to her. The Mississippi Supreme Court rejected his will. Later Freeman served as member of the Democratic State central committee and served as chairman. He moved to Colorado and settled in Canon City in 1882. He resumed the practice of his profession.

References

Specific

1817 births
1886 deaths
Unionist Party members of the United States House of Representatives from Mississippi
Mississippi Unionists
Mississippi Democrats
Mississippi Attorneys General
People from Cooperstown, New York
People from Natchez, Mississippi
People from Cañon City, Colorado
Members of the United States House of Representatives from Mississippi